John Prescott (c. 1327 – 1412), of Prescott, Rake and Exeter, Devon, was an English politician.

He was a Member (MP) of the Parliament of England for Exeter in 1361, 1363, 1365, and 1368, for Totnes in 1366, 1372 and 1373, and for Devon in November 1390.

References

1327 births
1412 deaths
English MPs 1361
Members of the Parliament of England (pre-1707) for Exeter
Members of the Parliament of England (pre-1707) for Totnes
Members of the Parliament of England (pre-1707) for Devon
English MPs 1363
English MPs 1365
English MPs 1368
English MPs 1366
English MPs 1372
English MPs 1373
English MPs November 1390